Oued Lilli is a town and commune in Tiaret Province in northwestern Algeria.

References

Communes of Tiaret Province